La frontera de Dios is a 1965 Spanish drama film directed by César Fernández Ardavín, written by José Luis Martín Descalzo and starring Alicia Altabella, Mercedes Barranco, Frank Braña. It is based on the novel by José Luis Martín Descalzo, which won the Premio Nadal.

Cast

References

External links
 

Spanish drama films
Films directed by César Fernández Ardavín
Films scored by Regino Sainz de la Maza
Films shot in Spain
Films based on Spanish novels